The 1998 CONCACAF Cup Winners Cup was the seventh edition of this defunct tournament contended between 1991 and 1998. After this season the tournament was re-branded as CONCACAF Giants Cup for the 2001 season.

Qualifying rounds

Central Zone

Group A 

 Juventus were disqualified and forfeited their remaining matches (vs Águila and Suchitepéquez at home; it is assumed both matches were awarded 0-3)

Group B 
Was to be played in Honduras between  Platense,  Diriangén,  C.S. Herediano, and  Tauro.

Tournament was abandoned (making it the third consecutive CONCACAF Cup Winners' Cup tournament which was started but not finished).

References 

2
CONCACAF Cup Winners Cup